Jan van Mersbergen (born 10 April 1971, Gorinchem) is a Dutch novelist. He has written five novels, including Morgen zijn we in Pamplona (2007) which has been translated into German, French and English. Van Mersbergen received in 2011 and 2012 twice €35,000 subsidies for a novel.

References

1971 births
Living people
21st-century Dutch novelists
Dutch male novelists
People from Gorinchem
21st-century Dutch male writers